Murtigh (also Romanized as Mūrtīgh; also known as Martīgh) is a village in Tabas-e Masina Rural District, Gazik District, Darmian County, South Khorasan Province, Iran. At the 2006 census, its population was 204, in 43 families.

References 

Populated places in Darmian County